The 2022 Stanley Cup playoffs was the playoff tournament of the National Hockey League (NHL). The playoffs began on May 2, 2022, one day after the 2021–22 NHL regular season, and concluded on June 26, 2022, with the Colorado Avalanche winning their third Stanley Cup in franchise history, defeating the Tampa Bay Lightning four games to two in the Stanley Cup Finals.

With the Government of Canada allowing cross-border travel for fully vaccinated players and team personnel between Canada and the United States, the league was able to return to its usual two conference, four division alignment. As a result, the standard 16-team playoff format that was used before the COVID-19 pandemic from 2014–2019 was reinstated.

The Florida Panthers made the playoffs as the Presidents' Trophy winners with the most points (i.e. best record) during the regular season. The Pittsburgh Penguins increased their postseason appearance streak to 16 seasons, the longest active streak in the four major North American professional sports leagues. Three of the semifinalists from the previous season (the Montreal Canadiens, New York Islanders and Vegas Golden Knights) failed to qualify for the playoffs. The Los Angeles Kings ended a two-year run in which no teams from California qualified for the playoffs. All eight playoff teams from the Eastern Conference finished the season with at least 100 points, marking the first playoffs in NHL history in which all eight teams in a single conference qualified with at least 100 points.

Florida's opening round series victory over the Washington Capitals was their first series win since the 1996 Eastern Conference Finals. This postseason marked the third time that the league has played 50 or more games in the opening round of the playoffs since this round was changed to a best-of-seven format in 1987. The First Round featured five Game 7s, the most in a single playoff round since 1992, when there were six Game 7s in the Division Semifinals. On May 15, for the first time since 1997, and the second time in League history, both Game 7s went into overtime. With their Conference Final series victory, the Tampa Bay Lightning became the third team in league history to win at least eleven consecutive playoff series; joining the Montreal Canadiens (1976–1980) and New York Islanders (1980–1984) in accomplishing this feat.

Playoff seeds

This was the seventh year and first since 2019, in which the top three teams in each division made the playoffs, along with two wild cards in each conference (for a total of eight playoff teams from each conference).

The following teams qualified for the playoffs:

Eastern Conference

Atlantic Division
 Florida Panthers, Atlantic Division champions, Eastern Conference regular season champions, Presidents' Trophy winners – 122 points
 Toronto Maple Leafs – 115 points
 Tampa Bay Lightning – 110 points (39 )

Metropolitan Division
 Carolina Hurricanes, Metropolitan Division champions – 116 points
 New York Rangers – 110 points (44 )
 Pittsburgh Penguins – 103 points

Wild Cards
 Boston Bruins – 107 points
 Washington Capitals – 100 points

Western Conference

Central Division
 Colorado Avalanche, Central Division champions, Western Conference regular season champions – 119 points
 Minnesota Wild – 113 points
 St. Louis Blues – 109 points

Pacific Division
 Calgary Flames, Pacific Division champions – 111 points
 Edmonton Oilers – 104 points
 Los Angeles Kings – 99 points

Wild Cards
 Dallas Stars – 98 points
 Nashville Predators – 97 points

Playoff bracket
In each round, teams compete in a best-of-seven series following a 2–2–1–1–1 format (scores in the bracket indicate the number of games won in each best-of-seven series). The team with home ice advantage plays at home for games one and two (and games five and seven, if necessary), and the other team is at home for games three and four (and game six, if necessary). The top three teams in each division make the playoffs, along with two wild cards in each conference, for a total of eight teams from each conference. 

In the First Round, the lower seeded wild card in each conference played against the division winner with the best record while the other wild card played against the other division winner, and both wild cards were de facto #4 seeds. The other series matched the second and third place teams from the divisions. In the first two rounds, home ice advantage was awarded to the team with the better seed. In the Conference Finals and Stanley Cup Finals, home ice advantage was awarded to the team with the better regular season record.

Legend
 A1, A2, A3 – The first, second, and third place teams from the Atlantic Division, respectively
 M1, M2, M3 – The first, second, and third place teams from the Metropolitan Division, respectively
 C1, C2, C3 – The first, second, and third place teams from the Central Division, respectively
 P1, P2, P3 – The first, second, and third place teams from the Pacific Division, respectively
 WC – Wild Card teams

First Round

Eastern Conference First Round

(A1) Florida Panthers vs. (WC2) Washington Capitals
The Florida Panthers earned the Presidents' Trophy as the NHL's best regular season team with 122 points. Washington finished as the Eastern Conference's second wild card, earning 100 points. This was the first playoff meeting between these two teams. Florida won two of the three games in this year's regular season series.

The Panthers defeated the Capitals in six games and won their first playoff series since 1996. In Game 1, the Capitals overcame a one-goal deficit in the third period and gained the lead at 10:37 on T. J. Oshie's goal to win 4–2. Aleksander Barkov and Carter Verhaeghe both scored a goal and an provided an assist in the Panthers' 5–1 victory in Game 2. Ilya Samsonov made 29 saves for the Capitals in Game 3, outscoring the Panthers 6–1 and taking a 2–1 series lead. Verhaeghe scored twice in Game 4, including the overtime-winning goal for the Panthers, tying the series up 2–2 in a 3–2 triumph. In Game 5, Verhaeghe scored twice and assisted on the other three Panthers’ goals in Florida's three-goal comeback, taking the game 5–3 to lead the series 3–2. In Game 6, Claude Giroux scored a goal and provided two assists and Verhaeghe scored the overtime goal in a 4–3 victory sending the Panthers to the Second Round for the first time in 26 years.

(A2) Toronto Maple Leafs vs. (A3) Tampa Bay Lightning
The Toronto Maple Leafs finished second in the Atlantic Division, earning 115 points. The Tampa Bay Lightning earned 110 points to finish third in the Atlantic Division. This was the first playoff meeting between these two teams. These teams split their four-game regular season series.

The Lightning defeated the Maple Leafs in seven games. In Game 1, Maple Leaf's forward Auston Matthews provided two goals and an assist in Jack Campbell's 24-save 5–0 shutout. Victor Hedman had a goal and three assists for the Lightning in Game 2, giving Tampa Bay a 5–3 victory. In Game 3, Pierre Engvall provided three assists for the Maple Leafs, staving off a potential comeback from Tampa Bay and winning 5–2. In Game 4, the Lightning got off to a quick start, scoring three goals within the first eight minutes of the game en route to a 7–3 victory. The Maple Leafs came back from a 2–0 deficit in Game 5 with William Nylander providing a goal and two assists in a 4–3 victory. In Game 6, although the Maple Leafs came back from a two-goal deficit, the Lightning's Brayden Point scored in overtime to extend the series to a seventh game in a 4–3 affair. In Game 7, Nick Paul scored twice while the Lightning defended their 2–1 lead onto the victory and a Second Round advancement. With their loss in Game 7 the Maple Leafs have lost eight consecutive playoff series.

(M1) Carolina Hurricanes vs. (WC1) Boston Bruins
The Carolina Hurricanes finished first in the Metropolitan Division earning 116 points. Boston finished as the Eastern Conference's first wild card earning 107 points. This was the seventh playoff meeting between these two teams, with Boston winning five of the six previous series. They last met in the 2020 Eastern Conference First Round, which Boston won in five games. Carolina won all three games in this year's regular season series.

The Hurricanes defeated the Bruins in seven games, with the home team victorious in every game. Antti Raanta made 35 saves in Game 1, backstopping the Hurricanes in a 5–1 victory. Upon Hurricanes forward Nino Niederreiter's two goals and Pyotr Kochetkov's 30 saves in relief of Raanta, Carolina gained 2–0 series lead by defeating Boston 5–2. In Game 3, Brad Marchand scored a goal and provided two assists in the Bruins' 4–2 victory. In Game 4, Marchand scored or provided an assist on every Bruins goal in Boston's 5–2 victory, tying the series 2–2. In Game 5, Seth Jarvis scored twice and Teuvo Teravainen assisted thrice in the Hurricanes 5–1 victory, taking a 3–2 series lead in the process. In Game 6, Charlie Coyle and Marchand each scored a goal and provided an assist in the Bruins' 5–2 victory tying the series 3–3. Max Domi scored twice and added an assist in Game 7, granting Carolina a 3–2 victory and an advancement to the Second Round.

(M2) New York Rangers vs. (M3) Pittsburgh Penguins
The New York Rangers finished second in the Metropolitan Division with 110 points. The Pittsburgh Penguins earned 103 points to finish third in the Metropolitan Division. This was the eighth playoff meeting between these two teams with Pittsburgh winning five of the seven previous series. They last met in the 2016 Eastern Conference First Round, which Pittsburgh won in five games. New York won three of the four games in this year's regular season series.

The Rangers came back from a 3–1 series deficit to defeat the Penguins in seven games. In Game 1, although Igor Shesterkin made 79 saves for the Rangers, Penguins forward Evgeni Malkin scored for Pittsburgh at 5:58 of triple overtime to win 4–3. In Game 2, Artemi Panarin and Frank Vatrano both scored a goal and provided two assists in the Rangers' 5–2 victory. In Game 3, although the Rangers tied the game after being down 4–1, Penguins forward Danton Heinen's goal proved to be the game-winning goal at 11:02 of the third period giving Pittsburgh a 7–4 victory. The Penguins scored five times in the second period of Game 4, chasing goalie Shesterkin in a 7–2 route.  In Game 5, the Rangers successfully came back from a two-goal deficit to win 5–3, forcing a sixth game. Chris Kreider gave the Rangers a lead late in the third period of Game 6, giving his team a 5–3 victory and tying the series 3–3. In Game 7 and the subsequent overtime, Panarin scored for New York sending the Rangers to the Second Round with a 4–3 victory. This marked the first time the Penguins lost a Game 7 on the road in franchise history after winning the previous six instances. The Rangers equalled both the Montreal Canadiens and Vancouver Canucks for most comebacks from a 3–1 series deficit with three. The Rangers also became the first team in Stanley Cup playoff history to record three consecutive comeback wins in elimination games within the same series.

Western Conference First Round

(C1) Colorado Avalanche vs. (WC2) Nashville Predators
The Colorado Avalanche finished first in the Central Division and Western Conference earning 119 points. The Nashville Predators earned 97 points to finish as the Western Conference's second wild card. This was the second playoff meeting between these two teams. Their only previous meeting was in the 2018 Western Conference First Round, which Nashville won in six games. Nashville won three of the four games in this year's regular season series.

The Avalanche defeated the Predators in a four-game sweep. Colorado scored five times in the first period of Game 1, forcing Nashville to switch goalies in a 7–2 affair. In Game 2, the Avalanche shot 51 times at Predators' goalie Connor Ingram and at 8:31 of overtime, Cale Makar scored to give Colorado a 2–1 victory. Gabriel Landeskog scored and assisted twice in Game 3, helping the Avalanche obtain both a 7–3 victory and 3–0 series lead. In Game 4, Andre Burakovsky's goal and two assists helped lift the Avalanche to a 5–3 victory, advancing to the Second Round.

(C2) Minnesota Wild vs. (C3) St. Louis Blues
The Minnesota Wild finished second in the Central Division earning 113 points. The St. Louis Blues earned 109 points to finish third in the Central Division. This was the third playoff meeting between these teams with the teams splitting the two previous series. They last met in the 2017 Western Conference First Round, which St. Louis won in five games. St. Louis won all three games in this year's regular season series.

The Blues defeated the Wild in six games. In Game 1, Ville Husso made 37 saves for the Blues and David Perron scored a hat trick in St. Louis' 4–0 victory. The Wild returned with a hat trick of their own in Game 2 when Kirill Kaprizov scored Minnesota's first playoff hat trick in a 6–2 victory. Marc-Andre Fleury made 29 saves for the Wild in Game 3, backstopping Minnesota into a 5–1 victory. Blues captain Ryan O'Reilly scored a goal and two assists in Game 4, leading St. Louis to a 5–2 victory. Vladimir Tarasenko scored a hat trick in Game 5 spearheading his team to another 5–2 victory and a 3–2 series lead. In Game 6, Jordan Binnington made 25 saves for the Blues, defeating the Wild 5–1 and advancing to the Second Round.

(P1) Calgary Flames vs. (WC1) Dallas Stars
The Calgary Flames finished first in the Pacific Division earning 111 points. The Dallas Stars finished as the Western Conference's first wild card earning 98 points. This was the third playoff meeting between these two teams with Dallas winning both previous series. They last met in the 2020 Western Conference First Round, which Dallas won in six games. Calgary won two of the three games in this year's regular season series.

The Flames defeated the Stars in seven games. In Game 1, Calgary's defence limited the Stars' offence to 16 shots as goalie Jacob Markstrom claimed a 1–0 victory. The Stars responded with their own shutout victory in Game 2, scoring twice in a 2–0 affair with Jake Oettinger making 29 saves in the process. Joe Pavelski lead the Stars with two goals in Game 3, giving Dallas a 4–2 victory and a 2–1 series lead. The Flames put 54 shots on the Stars goaltender, and with four shots turning into goals, Calgary won Game 4, 4–1. In Game 5, Mikael Backlund and Andrew Mangiapane each scored a goal and provided an assist in Calgary's 3–1 comeback victory. In Game 6, Oettinger made 36 saves for the Stars leading his team to a 4–2 victory and forcing a seventh game. The Flames put on 67 shots in Game 7, but with two finding the back of the net on both sides, the game went into overtime. In the extra period, Calgary forward Johnny Gaudreau scored to give the Flames a 3–2 victory and a Second Round advancement. In the loss, Oettinger became the second goalie since 1955 to post 60 or more saves in a seventh game.

(P2) Edmonton Oilers vs. (P3) Los Angeles Kings
The Edmonton Oilers finished second in the Pacific Division with 104 points. The Los Angeles Kings earned 99 points to finish third in the Pacific Division. This was the eighth playoff meeting between these two teams with Edmonton winning five of the seven previous series. They last met in the 1992 Smythe Division Semifinals, which Edmonton won in six games. Edmonton won three of the four games in this year's regular season series.

The Oilers defeated the Kings in seven games. In Game 1, Phillip Danault's goal with 5:14 left in the third period proved to be the game-winning goal for the Kings who edged the Oilers 4–3. Mike Smith stopped all 30 shots in Game 2, ending his ten-game playoff losing streak with a 6–0 shutout victory. The Oilers dominated Game 3, forcing Los Angeles to switch goalies and giving Evander Kane a hat trick in the process of an 8–2 rout. Jonathan Quick claimed a 31-save shutout in Game 4, backstopping the Kings to a 4–0 victory. In the process, he became the leading United States-born goalie in playoff shutouts with 10. In Game 5, the Oilers came back from a two-goal deficit to tie the match, however, Kings forward Adrian Kempe's overtime goal, his second score of the affair, gave Los Angeles the 5–4 victory and a 3–2 series lead. In Game 6, Connor McDavid scored a goal and provided two assists in the Oilers' 4–2 victory, forcing a seventh game in Edmonton. In Game 7, McDavid scored and assisted in a 2–0 victory as they advanced to the Second Round.

Second Round

Eastern Conference Second Round

(A1) Florida Panthers vs. (A3) Tampa Bay Lightning

This was the second consecutive and the second overall playoff meeting between these two rivals. Tampa Bay won the previous year's Stanley Cup First Round series in six games. These teams split their four-game regular season series.

The Lightning defeated the Panthers in a four-game sweep. In Game 1, Corey Perry and Nikita Kucherov both scored a goal and assisted in Tampa Bay's 4–1 victory. Ross Colton's goal with 3.8 seconds left in Game 2 provided Tampa Bay with a 2–1 victory and a 2–0 series lead. Kucherov scored a goal and assisted three times in the Lightning's 5–1 victory of Game 3, who took a 3–0 series lead in the process. In Game 4, Andrei Vasilevskiy made 49 saves in a 2–0 shutout, advancing the Lightning to the Conference Final for the third consecutive season. With their victory, they became the first team since the 1980–1984 New York Islanders dynasty to win ten consecutive playoff series and they equalled the 1956–1960 Montreal Canadiens in consecutive series victories.

(M1) Carolina Hurricanes vs. (M2) New York Rangers

This was the second playoff meeting between these two teams. Their only previous meeting was in the 2020 Eastern Conference Qualifying Round, which Carolina won in a three-game sweep. Carolina won three of the four games in this year's regular season series.

The Rangers defeated the Hurricanes in seven games. After Sebastian Aho tied the game late for Carolina in Game 1, Ian Cole scored in overtime to give the Hurricanes a 2–1 victory. In Game 2, Aho scored a goal and provided an assist in Antti Raanta's 21 save shutout for the Hurricanes' 2–0 victory. The Rangers rebounded in Game 3; aided by Igor Shesterkin's 43 saves, New York defeated Carolina 3–1. In Game 4, Andrew Copp notched a goal and two assists in the Rangers 4–1 victory, evening the series 2–2. The Hurricanes shot 34 times at Shesterkin in Game 5, banking in three goals for a 3–1 victory and a 3–2 series lead. In Game 6, Shesterkin made 37 saves and Filip Chytil scored twice for the Rangers who defeated Carolina 5–2 to force a seventh game. New York shut the door on Carolina in Game 7, outscoring the Hurricanes 6–2 to advance to the Conference Final for the first time since 2015.

Western Conference Second Round

(C1) Colorado Avalanche vs. (C3) St. Louis Blues

This was the second consecutive playoff meeting and the third overall between these two teams with Colorado winning both previous series. Colorado won the previous year's Stanley Cup First Round series in a four-game sweep. Colorado won two of the three games in this year's regular season series.

The Avalanche defeated the Blues in six games. In Game 1, the Avalanche poured 51 shots at Blues goaltender Jordan Binnington, however, the final shot in overtime by defenceman Josh Manson gave Colorado a 3–2 victory. David Perron scored twice in Game 2 and with Binnington stopping 30 shots, St. Louis won 4–1. Binnington was injured and knocked out of the remainder of the series in the first period of Game 3, and Artturi Lehkonen scored twice for the Avalanche, as Colorado downed the Blues 5–2 for a 2–1 series lead. In Game 4, Nazem Kadri scored a hat trick and provided an assist in the Avalanche's 6–3 victory. Game 5 featured a wild scoring affair as the Avalanche had gained a three-goal lead and lost it, but banking off Nathan MacKinnon's hat trick goal with 2:46 remaining in the third period, Colorado retrieved a one-goal lead. St. Louis managed to tie the game again, and in the subsequent overtime period, Tyler Bozak scored to give the Blues a 5–4 victory. In Game 6, Darren Helm's goal with 5.6 seconds remaining proved to be the series-winning goal for Colorado, who advanced to the Conference Final for the first time since 2002.

(P1) Calgary Flames vs. (P2) Edmonton Oilers
This was the sixth playoff meeting between these two rivals with Edmonton winning four of the five previous series. They last met in the 1991 Smythe Division Semifinals, which Edmonton won in seven games. These teams split their four-game regular season series.

The Oilers defeated the Flames in five games. Game 1 was an offensive outburst on both sides with a total of fifteen goals, the most in a playoff game within the Battle of Alberta. The Flames who reached a 6–2 lead had that advantage disappear as the Oilers tied the game, however, two of Matthew Tkachuk's hat trick goals sealed the victory for Calgary in a 9–6 affair. The Oilers successively overcame a two-goal deficit in Game 2 with Leon Draisaitl providing a goal and two assists in a 5–3 victory. The Oilers line of Evander Kane, Connor McDavid, and Draisaitl dominated the second period of Game 3 with Kane scoring a natural hat-trick, Draisaitl assisting four times, an NHL playoff record, and McDavid assisting three times, leading to an eventual 4–1 victory. In Game 4, the Flames tied the game after being down by three goals; however, Ryan Nugent-Hopkins's second goal broke the tie for Edmonton, scoring with 3:37 left in the game to lead the Oilers to a 5–3 victory and a 3–1 series lead. Game 5 was mainly a back-and-forth affair, with exception to the two-goal comeback by the Oilers. During the second period, Calgary and Edmonton combined to score four goals in 1:11, setting an NHL record for the fastest four goals in a playoff game. During the third period, Calgary had a late goal by Blake Coleman disallowed after video review determined that the puck was kicked into the net. With the game tied at the end of the third period, both teams headed to overtime where McDavid scored to send Edmonton to the Conference Final for the first time since 2006.

Conference Finals

Eastern Conference Final

(M2) New York Rangers vs. (A3) Tampa Bay Lightning 

This was the second playoff meeting between these two teams. New York made their seventh Semifinals/Conference Final appearance since the league began using a 16-team or greater playoff format in 1980. They lost their most recent appearance in the 2015 Eastern Conference Final, also the most recent playoff meeting between these two teams, in seven games to Tampa Bay. This was Tampa Bay's eighth Semifinals/Conference Final since entering the league and their third consecutive Third Round appearance, the first team to accomplish this feat since the 2015 Chicago Blackhawks. They won the previous year's Semifinals against the New York Islanders in seven games. New York won all three games in this year's regular season series.

The Lightning defeated the Rangers in six games. Filip Chytil scored twice for the Rangers in Game 1, who defeated Tampa Bay 6–2. In Game 2, Igor Shesterkin made 29 saves for the Rangers in a 3–2 affair which ended the Lightning's 18-game win streak after losing the prior game. The Lightning recovered in Game 3, coming back from a 2–0 deficit, and with Ondrej Palat's goal with 42 seconds left in the game, Tampa Bay defeated New York 3–2. In Game 4, Palat scored a goal and provided two assists in goalie Andrei Vasilevskiy's 34 save performance to defeat New York 4–1 and tie the series 2–2. Palat continued his late-goal antics into Game 5, scoring with 1:50 left in the third period to lead the Lightning to a 3–1 victory and a 3–2 series lead. In Game 6, the captain Steven Stamkos scored twice to give the Lightning a 2–1 victory and a trip to the Stanley Cup Finals for the third consecutive season.

Western Conference Final

(C1) Colorado Avalanche vs. (P2) Edmonton Oilers

This was the third playoff meeting between these two teams with both teams splitting the two previous series. They last met in the 1998 Western Conference Quarterfinals, which Edmonton came back from a 3–1 series deficit to win in seven games. This was Colorado's ninth appearance in the Conference Final. They were defeated in seven games by the Detroit Red Wings in their most recent Conference Finals appearance in 2002. Edmonton made their tenth appearance in the Conference Finals. Their most recent appearance was in the 2006 Western Conference Final, which Edmonton won against the Mighty Ducks of Anaheim in five games. Colorado won two of the three games in this year's regular season series.

The Avalanche defeated the Oilers in a four-game sweep. In Game 1, the Avalanche held off a potential four-goal comeback with an empty net goal to win 8–6. During the game, Cale Makar's goal appeared to be offside due to Valeri Nichushkin still needing to exit the offensive zone, however, the goal was deemed onside with Makar pushing the puck across the blue line and not in possession until Nichushkin became onside. Pavel Francouz stopped all 24 shots he faced in Game 2 and with Nazem Kadri's three assists, Colorado won 4–0. In Game 3, Nichushkin's two goals helped Colorado obtain a 4–2 victory and a 3–0 series lead. In Game 4, the Avalanche came back from a two-goal deficit to take the lead, but the Oilers tied the game and it went to overtime. In overtime, Artturi Lehkonen scored to send Colorado to the Finals for the first time since 2001.

Stanley Cup Finals

This was the first playoff meeting between these two teams. Colorado made their third Finals appearance. They last appeared in the Finals in 2001, which Colorado won against the New Jersey Devils in seven games. This was Tampa Bay's third consecutive Finals appearance and fifth overall, they were the first team to appear in three consecutive Finals since the 1985 Edmonton Oilers. They won the previous year's Finals against the Montreal Canadiens in five games. Colorado won both games in this year's regular season series.

Player statistics

Skaters
These are the top ten skaters based on points, following the conclusion of the playoffs.

Goaltenders
This is a combined table of the top five goaltenders based on goals against average and the top five goaltenders based on save percentage, with at least 420 minutes played. The table is sorted by GAA, and the criteria for inclusion are bolded.

Television and radio
In Canada, for the eighth postseason under Rogers Media's 12-year contract, coverage was broadcast by Sportsnet networks and CBC Television under the Hockey Night in Canada brand, and streamed on Sportsnet Now, CBCSports.ca (for games televised by CBC), or the subscription service NHL Live. For selected U.S.–U.S. series in the First Round, Sportsnet was simulcasting the U.S. feed instead of producing their own telecast.

In the U.S., this marked the first Stanley Cup playoffs under the NHL's 7-year broadcast rights deals with ESPN and TNT; during the First Round, games aired across ESPN, ESPN2, TBS, and TNT. For the Second Round onward, the games aired on either ESPN or TNT (except for one game in the Second Round which aired on ESPN2 due to Sunday Night Baseball airing on ESPN). Other ESPN and Turner channels (such as ESPNU, ESPNews, and TruTV) continued to be used in the event of overflow situations.  As before, each U.S. team's regional broadcaster televised local coverage of games during the First Round, after which all other games were exclusive to the ESPN networks and TNT.

In assigning broadcasters for each game, the NHL had to also work around the 2022 NBA playoffs, which share ESPN and TNT as rightsholders, and started ahead of the Stanley Cup playoffs. As per the new alternating rotation, ABC exclusively aired the Stanley Cup Finals.

Unlike past seasons, there was no coverage of playoff games on U.S. broadcast television until the Stanley Cup Finals (previous rightsholders such as NBC had traditionally offered weekend games on broadcast television during the early rounds), as ESPN had prioritized the carriage of NBA playoff games on broadcast television via ABC instead. Conversely, the Finals were carried in their entirety on broadcast television for the first time since 1980 (which was aired primarily by the Hughes Television Network, but with CBS acquiring the rights to the series-deciding Game 6 as a one-off CBS Sports Spectacular broadcast); since then, the Finals were either partially or exclusively carried on cable. There were no live games on over-the-top streaming services until the third round, as ESPN+ only streamed simulcasts of the Eastern Conference Finals and Stanley Cup Finals, and Turner Sports did not invoke its option to carry or simulcast games on HBO Max.

American national radio rights to select Stanley Cup playoff games, including the entire Conference Finals and Stanley Cup Finals, were broadcast on the Sports USA Radio Network via NHL Radio. This was the first of a four-year deal signed between the NHL and Sports USA to syndicate NHL games on U.S. national radio.

Announcers

First Round announcers

Second Round announcers

Conference Finals announcers

Stanley Cup Finals announcers

References

External links
 Stanley Cup playoffs

Stanley Cup playoffs
playoffs